Timothy James DeRuyter (born January 3, 1963) is an American football coach and former player who is currently the defensive coordinator at Texas Tech University. He previously served in the same capacity at the University of Oregon in 2021 and prior to that he was the associate head coach and defensive coordinator at the University of California, Berkeley from 2017 to 2020 and head coach at California State University, Fresno from 2012 to 2016.

Early years
A native of Long Beach, California, DeRuyter attended St. John Bosco High School in Bellflower and graduated in 1981. He played college football at Air Force from 1982 to 1984. He lettered at outside linebacker and was part of three bowl game victories. He graduated from the United States Air Force Academy in 1985. His family is of Dutch descent.

Coaching career

Early coaching career
DeRuyter has a history of turning college football defenses around. Before his second arrival at Ohio in 2002, the Bobcats ranked 99th nationally; upon his departure to Nevada, the Bobcats ranked 22nd. At Nevada, the Wolfpack improved from 78th to 48th under his tutelage. He also spent time at Navy.

Air Force
As the defensive coordinator at Air Force from 2007 to 2009, DeRuyter replaced a bend-but-don't-break scheme with an aggressive 3–4 defense. In 2006, prior to his arrival, the Falcons ranked 78th in scoring defense and 78th in total defense. In 2009, the Falcons finished 10th in scoring defense and 11th in total defense. In the 2009 Armed Forces Bowl 47-20 win against Houston, the Falcons limited the nation's second-ranked passing offense to a season-low of 222 passing yards. They also recorded six interceptions.

Texas A&M
DeRuyter became Texas A&M's defensive coordinator in 2010. The Aggies ranked 104th in scoring defense in 2009, under a 4–3 defense. In 2010, under his 3–4 defense, they improved to 21st in scoring defense. After Texas A&M fired head coach Mike Sherman in 2011, DeRuyter became the interim head coach for the Meineke Car Care Bowl, leading the Aggies to a 33–22 victory over Northwestern.

Fresno State
DeRuyter became the head coach of the Fresno State Bulldogs beginning the 2012 season. During the 2012 season, the Bulldogs team included standouts Derek Carr, Phillip Thomas, and Davante Adams. The Bulldogs were Mountain West conference champions after recording 7–1 conference records during the 2012 and 2013 seasons. During the 2014 season, they were conference division champions after posting a 5–3 conference record. His 2015 and 2016 teams did not see the same success, as both teams posted losing records.  He was fired by Fresno State on October 23, 2016, after starting the season 1–7 and 4–16 since playing in the Mountain West championship game in 2014. During his tenure, the Bulldogs were invited to three bowl games, but lost all three by at least 20 points each.

Cal
On January 23, 2017, DeRuyter was hired to be defensive coordinator at Cal. Prior to his arrival, Cal's defense ranked 127th in scoring defense and 125th in total defense in 2016. The defense improved over his tenure; over the 2017–2020 seasons, Cal's scoring defense ranked 79th, 22nd, 33rd, and 48th, respectively. The total defense ranked 95th, 15th, 65th, and 38th. The 2019 Cal defense featured All-American Evan Weaver, who led the nation in tackles. During his tenure at Cal, DeRuyter was the primary defensive coordinator from 2017 to 2019, but shared the responsibility with Peter Sirmon in 2020. For their coaching during the 2019 season, DeRuyter and Sirmon were named Linebackers Coaches of the Year by FootballScoop.

Oregon
On January 22, 2021, DeRuyter was hired to be the defensive coordinator at Oregon.

Texas Tech
On December 8, 2021, DeRuyter was hired to be the defensive coordinator and linebackers coach at Texas Tech University under head coach Joey McGuire.

Head coaching record

Notes

References

External links
 Oregon profile
 California profile

1963 births
Living people
American football linebackers
Air Force Falcons football players
Air Force Falcons football coaches
California Golden Bears football coaches
Fresno State Bulldogs football coaches
Navy Midshipmen football coaches
Nevada Wolf Pack football coaches
Ohio Bobcats football coaches
Oregon Ducks football coaches
Texas A&M Aggies football coaches
Texas Tech Red Raiders football coaches
Sportspeople from Long Beach, California
Coaches of American football from California
Players of American football from Long Beach, California
American people of Dutch descent
Military personnel from California